The Shuttle Radar Topography Mission (SRTM) is an international research effort that obtained digital elevation models on a near-global scale from 56°S to 60°N, to generate the most complete high-resolution digital topographic database of Earth prior to the release of the ASTER GDEM in 2009. SRTM consisted of a specially modified radar system that flew on board the Space Shuttle Endeavour during the 11-day STS-99 mission in February 2000. The radar system was based on the older Spaceborne Imaging Radar-C/X-band Synthetic Aperture Radar (SIR-C/X-SAR), previously used on the Shuttle in 1994. To acquire topographic data, the SRTM payload was outfitted with two radar antennas.  One antenna was located in the Shuttle's payload bay, the other – a critical change from the SIR-C/X-SAR, allowing single-pass interferometry – on the end of a 60-meter (200-foot) mast that extended from the payload bay once the Shuttle was in space. The technique employed is known as interferometric synthetic aperture radar. Intermap Technologies was the prime contractor for processing the interferometric synthetic aperture radar data.

The elevation models are arranged into tiles, each covering one degree of latitude and one degree of longitude, named according to their south western corners. For example, "n45e006" stretches from 45°N 6°E to 46°N 7°E and "s45w006" from 45°S 6°W to 44°S 5°W. The resolution of the raw data is one arcsecond (30 m along the equator) and coverage includes Africa, Europe, North America, South America, Asia, and Australia. A derived one arcsecond dataset with trees and other non-terrain features removed covering Australia was made available in November 2011; the raw data are restricted for government use. For the rest of the world, only three arcsecond (90 m along the equator) data are available. Each one arcsecond tile has 3,601 rows, each consisting of 3,601 16 bit bigendian cells. The dimensions of the three arcsecond tiles are 1201 x 1201. The original SRTM elevations were calculated relative to the WGS84 ellipsoid and then the EGM96 geoid separation values were added to convert to heights relative to the geoid for all the released products.

The elevation models derived from the SRTM data are used in geographic information systems. They can be downloaded freely over the Internet, and their file format (.hgt) is widely supported.

The Shuttle Radar Topography Mission is an international project spearheaded by the U.S. National Geospatial-Intelligence Agency (NGA), an agency of the U.S. Department of Defense, and the U.S. National Aeronautics and Space Administration (NASA). NASA transferred the SRTM payload to the Smithsonian National Air and Space Museum in 2003; the canister, mast, and antenna are now on display at the Steven F. Udvar-Hazy Center in Chantilly, Virginia.

Versions 
The USGS SRTM data is based on NASA's SIR-C instrument. It is available in at the following versions:
 Version 1 (2003-2004) is almost the raw data.
 Version 2.1 (~2005) is an edited version of v1. Artifacts are removed, but voids are not yet filled. There are 1-arcsecond data over the US.
 Version 3 (2013), also known as SRTM Plus, is void-filled with ASTER GDEM and USGS GMTED2010. This release is available in global 1-arcsecond (30 meter) resolution since 2014.

The SRTM also carries the X-SAR instrument operated by the German Aerospace Center (DLR) and Italian Space Agency (ASI). The resulting dataset is usually called SRTM/X-SAR, or SRTMX for short. The grid resolution is high at 25 meters, but it has many gaps. The data was made public in May 2011.

The terminology regarding versions and resolutions can be confusing. "SRTM1" and "SRTM3" refers to the resolutions in 1 and 3 arc-seconds, not the versions of the format. On the other hand, "SRTM4.1" refers to a specific filled version by CGIAR-CSI. It is recommended to add a "v" in front of the version number to disambiguate.

No-data areas 

The elevation datasets are affected by mountain and desert no-data areas. These amount to no more than 0.2% of the total area surveyed, but can be a problem in areas of very high relief. They affect all summits over 8,000 meters, most summits over 7,000 meters, many Alpine and similar summits and ridges, and many gorges and canyons. There are some SRTM data sources which have filled these data voids, but some of these have used only interpolation from surrounding data, and may therefore be very inaccurate. If the voids are large, or completely cover summit or ridge areas, no interpolation algorithms will give satisfactory results.

Void-filled SRTM datasets 

Groups of scientists have worked on algorithms to fill the voids of the original SRTM (v2.1) data. Three datasets offer global coverage void-filled SRTM data at full (3-arcsecond) resolution:

 The CGIAR-CSI version 4 provides the best global coverage using interpolation.
 The USGS HydroSHEDS dataset was generated for hydrological applications and is suitable for consistent drainage and water flow information. References are provided on the algorithms used and quality assessment.
 The void-filled SRTM data from Viewfinder Panoramas by Jonathan de Ferranti are high quality at full SRTM resolution. The data is filled using local survey maps and photographs. The OpenTopoMap website uses this fill. It has been partially updated for the 1-arcsecond release in the US.

In November 2013, LP DAAC released the NASA Shuttle Radar Topography Mission (SRTM) Version 3.0 (SRTM Plus) Product collection with all voids eliminated. Voids were filled primarily from ASTER GDEM2, and secondarily from USGS GMTED2010 – or USGS National Elevation Dataset (NED) for the United States (except Alaska) and northernmost Mexico according to the announcement.

Highest Resolution Global Release 
1-arc second global digital elevation model (30 meters) is available from the United States Geological Survey web site. The United States Government announced on September 23, 2014 over a United Nations Climate Summit that the highest possible resolution of global topographic data derived from the SRTM mission will be released to public. Before the end of the same year, a 1-arc second global digital elevation model (30 meters) was released. Most parts of the world have been covered by this dataset ranging from 54°S to 60°N latitude except for the Middle East and North Africa area. Missing coverage of the Middle East was completed in August 2015.

Users
In early June 2011, there were 750,000 confirmed users of SRTM topography dataset. Users in 221 countries have accessed the site.

See also 

 Interferometric Synthetic Aperture Radar
 Digital elevation model
 National Geospatial-Intelligence Agency
 Advanced Spaceborne Thermal Emission and Reflection Radiometer
 SRTM Water Body Data
 WorldDEM private data with higher resolution, from newer satellite TerraSAR-X-TanDEM-X

Notes

References 
 
 
 
 Hennig, T., Kretsch, J, Salamonowicz, P,  Pessagno, C, and Stein, W., The Shuttle Radar Topography Mission, Proceedings of the First International Symposium on Digital Earth Moving 2001, Springer Verlag, London, UK.

Further reading

External links 

 Official NASA SRTM site (SRTM V1 and V2)
 NASA MEaSUREs Products (SRTM V3 and more)
 NASA's server with SRTM data tiles – Please read the accompanying documentation
 Digital elevation data from Geoscience Australia – arcsecond-resolution derived data covering Australia
 Void filled SRTM data at CGIAR-CSI
 USGS HydroSHEDS – Full resolution SRTM-based DEM for hydrological applications
 Software that can read and process SRTM data: 3dem, GRASS GIS, SAGA GIS, MapWindow GIS, DG Terrain Viewer/Void Killer, Virtual Terrain Project
 Viewfinder Panoramas – Unofficial SRTM data with voids corrected using topographic maps

Digital elevation models
Space synthetic aperture radar
2000 in spaceflight
Spacecraft instruments
Topography techniques